Glimpse of the Garden is a 1957 five-minute short experimental film made by Marie Menken, showing film clips of a garden, with birds chirping for the soundtrack.
In 1958, the film won an award at the Exposition Universelle et Internationale at Brussels. In 2007, the film was included in the annual selection of 25 motion pictures added to the National Film Registry of the Library of Congress being deemed "culturally, historically, or aesthetically significant" and recommended for preservation.

See also
 List of avant-garde films of the 1950s
 Marie Menken

References

External links 
 
Glimpse of the Garden essay by Daniel Eagan in America's Film Legacy: The Authoritative Guide to the Landmark Movies in the National Film Registry, A&C Black, 2010 , pages 540-541 

American avant-garde and experimental films
United States National Film Registry films
1957 films
1957 short films
American short films
1950s avant-garde and experimental films
1950s American films